The Camp Fire was the deadliest and most destructive wildfire in California's history, and the most expensive natural disaster in the world in 2018 in terms of insured losses.

Named after Camp Creek Road, its place of origin, the fire started on Thursday, November 8, 2018, in Northern California's Butte County. Ignited by a faulty electric transmission line, the fire originated above several communities and an east wind drove the fire downhill through developed areas. After exhibiting extreme fire spread, fireline intensity, and spotting behaviors through the rural community of Concow, an urban firestorm formed in the foothill town of Paradise. Drought was a factor: Paradise, which typically sees five inches of autumn rain by November 12, had only received one-seventh of an inch by that date in 2018. With the arrival of the first winter rainstorm of the season, the fire reached 100 percent containment after seventeen days on November 25.

The Camp Fire caused at least 85 civilian fatalities, with one person still missing as of August 2, 2019, and injured 12 civilians and five firefighters. The towns of Paradise and Concow were almost completely destroyed, each losing about 95% of their structures. The towns of Magalia and Butte Creek Canyon were also largely destroyed. By January 2019, the total damage was estimated at $16.5 billion; one-quarter of the damage, $4 billion, was not insured. The Camp Fire also cost over $150 million in fire suppression costs, bringing the total cost of the fire to $16.65 billion.

The same month, Pacific Gas and Electric Company (PG&E), the utility company responsible for the faulty power line, filed for bankruptcy, citing expected wildfire liabilities of $30 billion. On December 6, 2019, the utility made a settlement offer of $13.5 billion for the wildfire victims; the offer covered several devastating fires caused by the utility, including the Camp Fire. On June 16, 2020, the utility pleaded guilty to 84 counts of involuntary manslaughter.

The Camp Fire is the deadliest wildfire in the United States since the Cloquet fire in 1918, and ranks number 13 on the list of the world's deadliest wildfires; it is the sixth-deadliest U.S. wildfire overall.

Background

Fire hazard studies 
In 2005, the California Department of Forestry and Fire Protection (Cal Fire) released a fire management plan for the region, which warned that the town of Paradise was at risk for an ember-driven conflagration similar to the Oakland firestorm of 1991. The report stated, "the greatest risk to the ridge communities is from an east wind driven fire that originates above the communities and blows downhill through developed areas."

The Camp Fire started in an area that had experienced 13 large wildfires since 1999. The area was most recently burned in 2008 following the Humboldt Fire and the larger Butte Lightning Complex fires. In June 2009, a Butte County civil grand jury report concluded that roads leading from Paradise and Upper Ridge communities had "significant constraints" and "capacity limitations" on their use as evacuation routes. The report noted a combination of road conditions "which increases the fire danger and the possibility of being closed due to fire and or smoke", namely sharp curves, inadequate shoulders, and fire hazards adjacent to shoulders, such as "fire fuel and steep slopes". The report also recommended a moratorium on new home construction in fire-prone areas. In September 2009, the Butte County Board of Supervisors called the grand jury report "not reasonable", citing improved building codes and fire prevention requirements as arguments against a moratorium.

Based on these reports, there had been warnings to Paradise city planners that they were not including study results in new plans. For example, in 2009, the town of Paradise proposed a reduced number of travel lanes on the roadways and received state funding from the California Department of Transportation to implement a road diet along Skyway, Pearson Road, and Clark Road, three of the town's main thoroughfares and evacuation routes.

In March 2015, an updated plan codified changes made after the 2008 fires that would convert Skyway into a one-way route during emergencies, effectively doubling its capacity.

Pre-fire fire prevention efforts
Residential development in wildland–urban interface areas such as Paradise and its vicinity are often located in state responsibility areas, where the State of California provides fire prevention and suppression. Due to a need for increased state resources to safeguard these communities, a special fee was imposed on property owners starting in 2011 to provide for fire prevention. However, the fee was unpopular with rural, predominantly conservative, lawmakers, landowners, and taxpayer groups. After collecting and spending $470 million, a measure to suspend and repeal the fee was approved by the California State Legislature in July 2017. Assemblyman Devon Mathis (Republican) claimed, "not one cent has gone to putting more boots on the ground."

Initially, much of the revenue funded existing fire programs; the process of building out new prevention programs was slow. However, the revenue did fund projects such as secondary evacuation routes and fuel reduction zones. In August 2018, three months before the fire, fire safe councils in the Paradise region were awarded $5 million in grants from the fire prevention fee program to pay for fuel reduction and education projects.

Despite years of fuel reduction funded by special fees, numerous wildfires ravaged wildland–urban communities. Investigations found that PG&E power line failures during high winds had caused many of the fires. Utilities have the ability to disable dangerous power lines; however, the nearly 100-year-old transmission lines required intentional manual effort. PG&E shut off residential power to some customers, particularly in Paradise, in the days leading up to the fire. Following the 2017 North Bay fires, PG&E adopted a policy that precluded shutting off lines carrying more than 115 kV due to the number of customers who would be adversely affected by such a shutdown.

Infrastructure oversight inspection
The California Public Utilities Commission (CPUC) is responsible for inspecting PG&E's electrical infrastructure. The scope of the CPUC in relation to the scope of electrical infrastructure is unbalanced, however, and the CPUC has had difficulty fulfilling their oversight mandate.

A CPUC inspection of the section of electrical infrastructure at the origin of the Camp Fire was omitted for six years. Many of the electrical towers are original to the Upper North Fork Feather River Project, which was constructed in the early 1900s. This section is the 115 kV Caribou-Palermo line. A 2009 inspection noted three-bolt connectors, used to join two conductors, were in need of replacement, which PG&E said had been done by 2016. In a 2011 audit, the CPUC found several thousand deficiencies, some of which PG&E disputed; it was not clear if the number of deficiencies on the Caribou-Palermo line was unusually high. A 2012 windstorm brought down five towers.

After the Camp Fire, the CPUC's Safety and Enforcement Table Mountain Division audited three years of the missing ten years of PG&E's records. A worn C-hook on a transmission tower touched off the fire—a hazard PG&E knew was urgent. Focusing on where the Camp Fire broke out, the audit found "the company was late in fixing 900 problems on its towers and other equipment, including two critical threats that regulators say languished more than 600 days before being repaired." In May 2018, the CPUC gave PG&E permission to replace the aging line, though the design did not include line hardening through high fire hazard areas.

Wildfire conditions and behavior
Conditions immediately leading up to and during the fire combined to create a highly combustible fuel load. These conditions included:
 Heavy grass cover due to a wet spring
 An unusually dry fall
 Decreased humidity due to several recent wind events (23% dropping to 10%)
 Unusually dry fuel (5% 1,000-hr. moisture level)
 Hot, dry, sustained and gusting high katabatic winds (25–35 mph), similar to the Diablo wind or the Santa Ana winds of the California Coast Ranges, locally known as the Jarbo winds.

The day the fire started, November 8, the fuel energy release component was above the historic record for that date; the first autumn rain normally occurs before November 1. In addition, the strong winds caused a Red Flag Warning to be issued on the day the fire started.

Regional previous burn patterns and topography also contributed to the fire. In Paradise, across from Rattlesnake Creek, the local fuel had never burned in recorded history. In addition, steep canyons in the area made firefighting access difficult.

Combined, the conditions formed a recipe for a firestorm. A subsequent Cal Fire report noted, "When the fire reached the town of Paradise, an urban firestorm began to spread from building to building, independent of vegetation." It was compared to the July 27, 1943, Royal Air Force bombing that caused the firestorm that consumed Hamburg, Germany, and killed an estimated 42,600 people, during World War II.

Timeline 
Pacific Gas and Electric Company (PG&E) notified customers for two days before November 8 that it might shut down power due to a forecast of high winds and low humidity. Ultimately, PG&E de-energized portions of Paradise on November 7, but not on November 8; however, even de-energizing Paradise would not have prevented the fire unless Pacific Gas and Electric Company (PG&E) chose to perform the manually intensive task of shutting down their 115 kV transmission lines located in and near Pulga, California.  The National Weather Service had issued a red flag warning for most of Northern California's interior, as well as Southern California, through the morning of November 9.

Early November 8 the northeasterly "Jarbo Winds" formed; a katabatic wind off the Great Basin that picked up speed as it funneled through the Feather Canyon.

On Thursday, November 8, 2018 around 6:15 a.m. there was a problem on a PG&E power transmission line above Poe Dam near Pulga, California in Butte County. A fire under power transmission lines near Poe Dam was reported to Cal Fire by a PG&E Rock Creek Powerhouse worker at 6:33 a.m. PST. The fire was first reported to the Rock Creek Powerhouse by a PG&E field crew. The location is accessed by Camp Creek Road above Poe Dam and the Feather River railroad tracks. Soon after this report, a size-up fire officer was dispatched. Within minutes, a few other people, most of them other PG&E workers, called in about the fire.

That afternoon airborne observers noted that an insulator had separated from the tower. PG&E later reported that power lines were down.

Arriving ten minutes later, Captain Matt McKenzie, the first unit on scene, observed rapid fire growth and extreme fire behavior. Possibly saving many, he radioed in a request for resources and evacuations with a note, "this has got potential for a major incident," and that he was "still working on [finding a way to] access [the fire]." Access to the fire was by a narrow mountain road, which the fire engines were too large to navigate. Air resources had to wait until 30 minutes after sunrise, i.e., 7:14 a.m., but due to winds, aircraft were not on the fire until the afternoon.

The community of Concow did not receive an evacuation warning before the fire arrived less than twenty minutes later around 7 a.m. A call at 7:07 a.m. from someone directly observing the fire reported it in Concow with high winds on it, they said it was "rippin'." Several additional calls from Concow followed soon thereafter. At 7:23 a.m. the Butte County Sheriff's Office began evacuating Pulga.

Calls from Concow and Paradise continued for an hour at nearly one call per minute to report a fire — all were told there was no danger, that the fire was north of Concow off Highway 70, that there was no evacuation, and that authorities would contact residents if there were danger.

By 8 a.m. PST, the fire entered the town of Paradise. Several minutes later, "the Butte County Fire Department notified Paradise dispatchers of their orders to evacuate the entire town" which would be in a sequence of zones beginning with the east side of town. At some point that day, emergency shelters were established. Wind speeds approached , allowing the fire to grow rapidly. Most residents of Concow and many residents of Paradise were unable to evacuate before the fire arrived. Due to the speed of the fire, firefighters for the most part never attempted to prevent the flames from entering Concow or Paradise, and instead sought to help people get out alive. According to Chief Scott McLean of Cal Fire, "Pretty much the community of Paradise is destroyed, it's that kind of devastation. The wind that was predicted came and just wiped it out."

The first hours saw a cascade of failures in the emergency alert system, rooted in its patchwork, opt-in nature, and compounded by a loss of 17 cell towers. Thousands of calls to 9-1-1 inundated two emergency dispatchers on duty. Emergency alerts suffered human error as city officials failed to include four at-risk areas of the city in evacuation orders and technical error as emergency alerts failed to reach 94 percent of residents in some areas and even in areas with the highest success still failed to reach 25 percent of those residents signed up.

The day after the fire started, PG&E employees noted the Big Bend's line equipment on the ground.

On November 10, an estimate placed the number of structures destroyed at 6,713, which surpassed the Tubbs Fire as the most destructive wildfire in California history, but that has since been updated to 18,793.

By November 15, 5,596 firefighters, 622 engines, 75 water tenders, 101 handcrews, 103 bulldozers, and 24 helicopters from all over the Western United States were deployed to fight the fire.

In the first week, the fire burned tens of thousands of acres per day. Containment on the western half was achieved when the fire reached primary highway and roadway arteries that formed barriers. In the second week the fire expanded by several thousand acres per day along a large uncontained fire line. Each day, containment increased by 5 percent along the uncontained eastern half of the fire that expanded into open timber and high country.
 November 9, the fire burned .
 November 14 PG&E employees noted a broken C hook and a disconnected insulation anchor on a nearby tower.
 November 15, the fire was 140,000 acres and 40 percent contained.
 November 16, the fire was 146,000 acres and 50 percent contained.
 November 17, the fire was 149,000 acres and 55 percent contained.
 November 21, 85 percent containment; with rain falling, fire activity from November 21-on described as minimal.
 November 22, 90 percent containment.

Heavy rainfall started on November 21, which helped contain the fire. Fire crews pulled back and let the rain put out the remaining fires while teams searched for victims.

Impact

Fatalities and injuries 

There were a large number of fatalities in the first several hours of the fire, but they were not found quickly. Discovery of these early fatalities took place over the course of the following two weeks. In the first week, nearly ten victims per day were found. In the second week, that lowered to several victims per day. Victims were still being found in the third week and beyond.

 November 10, fourteen bodies were discovered, bringing casualties to 23.
 November 11, casualties increased to 29 after another six bodies discovered.
 November 13, casualties increased to 48, making it the single-deadliest wildfire in California history, surpassing the 1933 Griffith Park Fire, which killed 29 people.
 November 14, casualties increased from 48 to 56.
 November 16, casualties increased from 63 to 71.
 November 17, An additional five deaths brought the total to 76. President Donald Trump, Governor Jerry Brown, Governor-elect Gavin Newsom, and Federal Emergency Management Agency (FEMA) director Brock Long toured the Paradise area, and they held a short conference in the afternoon.
 November 18, casualties raised to 77.
 November 19, casualties raised to 79.
 November 20, casualties raised to 81.
 November 21, casualties raised to 83.
 November 23, casualties raised to 87.
 December 3, casualties revised to 85 after human remains in three separate bags were identified to be the same victim.

Identification of the deceased was hampered by the fragmentary condition of many bodies. Ten of 18 dentists in Paradise lost their offices and patient records in the fire. Two of the dead were identified from the serial numbers on artificial joints, 15 from dental records, five from fingerprints and 50 from DNA. Funerals and benefits were delayed by the identification difficulties. As of 2022, a few victims are still unidentified and are undergoing testing and identification by the DNA Doe Project.

Traffic jams on the few evacuation routes led to cars being abandoned while people evacuated on foot, but did not contribute to any deaths. At least seven deaths occurred when the fire overtook people who were trapped in their vehicles, most on Edgewood Road, as well as one person outside a vehicle and two on ATVs. Some residents who were unable to evacuate survived by sheltering in place at the American gas station and the Nearly New antique store across the street. Others gathered in the nearby parking lot shared by a KMart and a Save Mart. The survival of some of those who sheltered in place has raised the question of whether in some scenarios last-minute mass evacuations provide the best outcomes, with some pointing to Australia's policy discouraging them, instituted following the 1983 Ash Wednesday brushfires in which many of the 75 dead were killed while trying to evacuate. However, 70 of the 84 fatalities listed in the Butte County District Attorney's Camp Fire investigation summary occurred inside or immediately outside the victim's residences, indicating that failure to evacuate contributed to many more deaths (70) than occurred while evacuating (8).

Many seniors were evacuated by passersby and neighbors, with at least one account of dozens of evacuees jumping into a reservoir to escape the flames.

Butte County Sheriff's Department initially reported a partial death count for each community (total 67): 50 in Paradise, 7 in Concow, 9 in Magalia, and 1 in Chico.

In two separate incidents, a pair of fire captains, a firefighter, and a pair of prison inmate firefighters were burned. The first incident was a burnover, and the second incident was an exploding propane tank.

Summary of impact on population and first responders reported by Cal Fire.

Structural damage and displacement 

The fire forced the evacuation of Paradise, Magalia, Centerville, Concow, Pulga, Butte Creek Canyon,
Berry Creek and Yankee Hill and threatened the communities of Butte Valley, Chico, Forest Ranch, Helltown, Inskip, Oroville, and Stirling City.

The community of Concow and the town of Paradise were destroyed within the first six hours of the fire, losing an estimated 95 percent of their buildings. The town of Magalia also suffered substantial damage, and the community of Pulga, California suffered some. Nearly 19,000 buildings were destroyed, most of them homes, along with five public schools in Paradise, a rest home, churches, part of Feather River hospital, a Christmas tree farm, a large shopping center anchored by a Safeway, several fast food chains, such as Black Bear Diner and McDonald's, and numerous small businesses, as well. The Honey Run Covered Bridge over nearby Butte Creek, the last three-span Pratt-style truss bridge in the United States, was incinerated on November 10.

In May 2019, NPR reported that more than 1,000 families who were displaced by the fire were still looking for housing six months later. Rural northern California had been experiencing a severe housing shortage and growing homelessness crisis, compounded in part due to the fire. Prior to the fire, Chico had a housing vacancy rate of less than 3 percent. The loss of several thousand residences placed additional strain on Butte County's housing market. Average list prices for homes were reported to have increased by more than 10 percent.

Summary of structural damage reported by Cal Fire:

Note: Cal Fire damage updates do not contain categories tagged with *, however, a count was given November 17; also, '~' denotes an estimate.

Environmental 

The smoke from the fire resulted in widespread air pollution throughout the San Francisco Bay Area and Central Valley, prompting the closure of public schools in five Bay Area counties and dozens of districts in the Sacramento metropolitan area on November 16. Smoke was reportedly visible as far away as New York City after smoke plumes traveled a distance of over 3,000 miles. John Balmes, a physician at the University of California, Berkeley who sits on the California Air Resources Board, noted that the fire "[resulted in] the worst air pollution [ever] for the Bay Area and northern California."

Recovery efforts were slowed as crews tested burned debris for environmental contaminants such as asbestos, volatile organic compounds, heavy metals, arsenic, dioxins, and other hazardous materials that may have burned or spread in the fire.

The Butte County Health Officer, Andy Miller, declared the burned region uninhabitable. A strong warning was issued against rehabitation, noting, "[you] will be exposed to hazardous materials." In the weeks following the fire, Paradise City Council and Butte County Supervisors passed emergency ordinances to alleviate the delay in FEMA temporary housing by allowing residents to return to their land and live in temporary residences until the cleanup was completed and they could rebuild. However, with additional information it was clear there was a significant risk to public health and in early February 2019,
FEMA's Federal Coordinating Officer David Samaniego forced policymakers to retract the accommodation and remove residents from the burn area. Those policymakers released an announcement, "The Town of Paradise and Butte County were informed that emergency ordinances intended to provide a process for citizens to return to their properties prior to removal of the debris may impact federal funding. The disaster assistance is predicated on the need to remedy health and safety hazards that pose an immediate risk to citizens prior to living in recreational vehicles on their properties with structures burned during the Camp Fire." Emotions were summed up by resident Ben Walker while addressing the Paradise City Council: "I'm asking you not to throw the people of this town into the cold in the middle of winter. If the option is to choose federal money to rebuild the town, or the people to rebuild the town—choose the people".

Multiple drinking water systems across the burn area were chemically contaminated, and contaminated building plumbing. Benzene levels found in some drinking water samples, from multiple systems, exceeded hazardous waste levels. Other contaminants such as methylene chloride, vinyl chloride monomer, naphthalene, and others were also found above allowable drinking water exposure limits. In particular, methylene chloride was present above safe drinking water limits when benzene was not detected indicating benzene was not a predictor of wildfire contaminated water. Sources of this contamination are thought to include smoke being sucked into depressurized buried and building water system components and the thermal degradation of plastics in the water systems themselves.  Investigators found that traditional methods of calculating burn severity using satellite imagery were not appropriate for classifying localized burn severity within WUI communities. Density of structural loss was more predictive of water system contamination. Studies revealed significant hardship by households across the burn area who had standing homes lacking safe water. Household drinking water and plumbing education efforts were conducted by Purdue University, University of California Berkeley, Butte College, and Chico State University researchers in collaboration with the Camp Fire Zone Project. In 2020, the U.S. National Academies convened a workshop to address questions related to post-wildfire public health challenges.

Economic 
The volume of insurance claims overwhelmed Merced Property and Casualty Company, a small insurer founded in 1906, to the point of insolvency (policyholders' surplus $25 million). In response to a notice given by the company, the California Department of Insurance reviewed and then placed it into liquidation. This allows the California Insurance Guarantee Association, a state guaranty association, to cover claims. The Department of Insurance will continue with a review of all insurers with a domicile in California so to determine the exposure of each to Camp Fire losses. An estimate by the Los Angeles Times of Merced Property and Casualty Company's assets and reinsurance shows that they would only be able to cover 150 homes out of the 14,000 homes destroyed in a region where they were one of the only companies that still provided fire insurance policies despite the region being categorized as a high fire-hazard severity zone by the California Department of Forestry and Fire Protection. This is the only known instance of an insurance company becoming insolvent from a single event.

On November 16, the Chico city council passed an emergency ordinance to prohibit price gouging in Chico, by preventing the cost of rent, goods or services from being increased by more than 10 percent for 6 months.

PG&E bankruptcy 

Facing potential liabilities of $30 billion from the wildfire, the electrical utility that was responsible for the transmission line suspected of sparking the wildfire, Pacific Gas and Electric (PG&E), on January 14, 2019, began the process of filing for bankruptcy with a 15-day notice of intention to file for bankruptcy protection. On January 29, 2019 PG&E Corporation, the parent corporation of PG&E, filed for bankruptcy protection. Because fire survivors are unsecured creditors with the same priority as bondholders, they will only be paid in proportion to their claim size if anything is left after secured and priority claims are paid; it nearly ensures that they will not get paid in full. PG&E had a deadline of June 30, 2020 to exit bankruptcy in order to participate in the California state wildfire insurance fund established by AB 1054 that helps utilities pay for future wildfire claims.

PG&E settled for $1 billion with state and local governments in June, 2019, and settled for $11 billion with insurance carriers and hedge funds in September, 2019. Claims for wildfire victims consist of wrongful death, personal injuries, property loss, business losses, and other legal damages. Representatives for wildfire victims said PG&E owed $54 billion or more, and PG&E was offering $8.4 billion for fire damages, Cal Fire, and FEMA. FEMA originally requested PG&E for $3.9 billion from the wildfire victims fund, threatening to take the money from individual wildfire victims if PG&E did not pay, and Cal OES had an overlapping $2.3 billion request, but they later settled for $1 billion after all wildfire victims are paid.

On November 12, 2019, PG&E in its proposed reorganization plan provided an additional $6.6 billion for the claims of wildfire victims and other claimants, increasing the amount to $13.5 billion. In a filing with the Securities and Exchange Commission (SEC), this puts the total amount for fire claims at $25.5 billion. This consists of $11 billion to insurance companies and investment funds, $1 billion to state and local governments, and $13.5 billion for other claims.

On December 6, 2019, PG&E proposed to settle the wildfire victim claims for a total of $13.5 billion, which would cover liability for its responsibility originating from the Camp Fire, Tubbs Fire, Butte Fire, Ghost Ship warehouse fire, and also a series of wildfires beginning on October 8, 2017, collectively called the 2017 North Bay Fires. The offer was tendered as part of PG&E's plan to exit bankruptcy. Wildfire victims will get half of their $13.5 billion settlement as stock shares in the reorganized company, adding to the uncertainty as to when and how much they will be paid. On June 12, 2020, because of uncertainties in the value of the liquidated stock, in part because of the financial market impact of the COVID-19 pandemic, PG&E agreed to increase the amount of stock.

On June 16, 2020, PG&E pleaded guilty to 84 counts of involuntary manslaughter for those that died in the Camp Fire, for which it will pay the maximum fine of $3.5 million and end all further criminal charges against PG&E. This action does not alleviate PG&E of any future civil claims by victims of the Camp Fire which would fall outside the bankruptcy proceedings, as well as how existing litigation against PG&E may be handled.

On Saturday, June 20, 2020, U.S. Bankruptcy Judge Dennis Montali issued the final approval of the plan for the reorganized PG&E to exit bankruptcy, meeting the June 30, 2020 deadline for PG&E to qualify for the California state wildfire insurance fund for utilities.

Fire Victim Trust 
On July 1, 2020, the PG&E Fire Victim Trust (FVT) was established as part of the reorganization plan of the 2019 bankruptcy of PG&E to administer the claims of the wildfire victims. Also on July 1, PG&E funded the FVT with $5.4 billion in cash and 22.19% of stock in the reorganized PG&E, which covered most of the obligations of its settlement for the wildfire victims. PG&E had two more payments totaling $1.35 billion in cash that were paid in January 2021 and January 2022 to complete its obligations to the wildfire victims. For additional funding, on January 28, 2021, the FVT sued multiple PG&E contractors responsible for tree trimming, infrastructure inspections and maintenance for breach of contract and neglect, and on February 24, 2021, sued 22 former PG&E officers and directors for breach of fiduciary duty by failing to put in place policies and practices to respond to deficient tree trimming work and aging infrastructure. On September 29, 2022, the FVT announced that they had settled the lawsuit against PG&E's former officers and directors for $117 million.

Initially, the Trustee, the Honorable John K. Trotter (Ret.), and the Claims Administrator, Cathy Yanni, were in charge of the FVT. On July 1, 2022, Cathy Yanni became Trustee of the FVT, replacing Justice John Trotter. Claimants are wildfire victims from the 2015 Butte Fire, 2017 North Bay Fires, and 2018 Camp Fire in Northern California. The 2017 Tubbs Fire is considered to be one of the 2017 North Bay Fires. Victims of the 2019 Kincade Fire are not covered by the FVT. Victims of the 2016 Ghost Ship warehouse fire are not covered by the FVT, but by PG&E's insurance coverage for the year 2016.

Claims for wildfire victims include real estate and personal property, personal income loss, business loss, wrongful death, personal injury, emotional distress, zone of danger, and nuisance claims. Wildfire victims will be paid in cash, funded partly from the cash portion of the settlement, and partly from 478 million shares of PG&E stock that will be liquidated into cash on a schedule and at a price that is not yet determined. Starting November 23, 2020, the FVT began issuing Preliminary Payments up to $25,000 for those with significant losses. There were 71,394 wildfire victims who filed claims by the deadline of February 26, 2021. Starting March 15, 2021, the FVT began issuing the first installment of Pro Rata Payments (partial payments) to eligible claimants. This first installment was 30% of the Approved Claim Amount for their damages, because the total amount of money available to the FVT is unknown. Starting February 15, 2022, the FVT began issuing payments with a Pro Rata of 45%, meaning that those that had already received a payment would get a supplemental payment, and payments made after February 15, 2022 would be at 45%. As of September 30, 2022, there were 244,292 distinct claims that had been filed, and the FVT had distributed $5.08 billion to 49,301 wildfire victims.

Investigation 
The California Department of Forestry and Fire Protection and state utility regulators investigated Pacific Gas and Electric Company (PG&E) to determine if they complied with state laws in the areas burned in the fire. The Associated Press noted the fire started near a property where PG&E detected sparks on the day before its outbreak. PG&E was convicted of a felony due to a gas pipeline explosion in 2010 and is on probation, which means penalties for subsequent crimes are enhanced. PG&E also reported damage to the Caribou-Palermo transmission line 15 minutes before flames were first reported under the wires; the same line was previously damaged in a windstorm in December 2012.

Investigators believe that the failure of a badly maintained steel hook holding up a high voltage line was a key cause of the fire. A PG&E report to CPUC on December 11, 2018 said that "it had found a hook designed to hold up power lines on the tower was broken before the fire, and that the pieces showed wear."

A distribution line in Concow malfunctioned a half hour later, which was considered as a possible second ignition source. On November 11, PG&E employees saw bullets and bullet holes on pole equipment from the Big Bend distribution line affected by that outage, and downed wires, damaged poles and fallen trees about two thirds of a mile away.

Following the fire, multiple fire victims sued PG&E and its parent company in San Francisco County Superior Court before a definite cause had been determined, accusing PG&E of failure to properly maintain its infrastructure and equipment. In mid-May 2019, California state investigators announced that PG&E was responsible for the fire. The Cal Fire report was sent to the Butte County District Attorney Mike Ramsey.

Response

First responders 
While successful in evacuating nearly the entire town of Paradise, first responders were limited by an insufficient number of cell phone repeaters, which resulted in communication difficulties and reduced Internet speed: "Paradise quickly lost its equipment, the California Public Utilities Commission confirmed." The wildfire alert system was similarly hampered by damaged cell towers; 17 towers burned the first day. Many residents didn't sign up for the warnings, some neighborhoods for some reason did not receive any warnings, and the failure rate of the warnings that did get sent ranged from 25 to 94 percent.

Randall L. Stephenson, AT&T CEO, committed to fixing this problem, as AT&T added mobile repeaters to improve coverage. Two weeks into the fire, 66 cell repeaters were still damaged or out of service, and the remaining cell infrastructure was overloaded.

Only two dispatchers were on duty to field thousands of calls to 911.

Initial widespread confusion about reporting missing people limited the search for victims. The Butte County Sheriff's Office opened a call center, staffed daily from 8:00 a.m. to 8:00 p.m., to provide and receive information and inquiries on missing persons.

The North Valley Animal Disaster Group worked with law enforcement and other shelters, rescue groups and independent operations to rescue and reunite pets and families, and established an animal shelter at the Chico Airport.

Fire resources were stretched as the fire began on the same day as the Woolsey Fire and the Hill Fire in Southern California. Camp Fire resource requests alone equalled the entire 6,000 Cal Fire full-time fire professionals. Both fires pulled resources from 17 states to respond.

By the second day of the fire, only half the fire resources had assembled. The initial response within Paradise was shouldered by Paradise's three fire engines in stations 81, 82, and 83, and the two engines at Butte County Cal Fire Station 35.

At the height of deployment, there were 5,596 firefighters (including 770 inmate firefighters), 622 engines, 75 water tenders, 101 fire crews, 103 bulldozers, 24 helicopters, and 12 fixed-wing aircraft.

On the morning of ignition, high winds limited fixed-wing air support. By that afternoon, calming winds allowed for 9 fixed-wing aircraft on the fire, including 5 - 1,200-gal S-2 Trackers, 3 - 3,000-gal BAE 146s, and a 12,000-gal DC-10 Air Tanker. Eventually, three additional aircraft were deployed from out of state, including 2 - 1,620-gal CL-415 Super Scoopers that arrived from their home in Washington on November 9 and a 19,600-gal 747 Supertanker that arrived from its home in Colorado on November 11 after gaining a contract to work on federal land.

The California National Guard activated 700 soldiers to assist, including 100 military police officers from the 49th Brigade to provide security and search for remains with the assistance of 22 cadaver dogs. The
2632nd Transportation company provided haul trucks. The 140th Regiment provided air support. The 224th Sustainment Brigade constructed Alaska tents for temporary facilities.

Evacuation centers 
From November 8 to December 1, an encampment formed in a vacant lot next to the Walmart store in nearby Chico. The camp was in addition to motel room vouchers from FEMA and ten shelters established by the Red Cross and churches to house evacuees. Over a hundred people had become ill with norovirus at the shelters due to poor hygiene in overcrowded centers—prompting many to camp outdoors. Volunteers from across the region came to the camp and provided services for food, shelter, and sanitation; fire refugees referred to their camp as 'Wallywood.' The camp population swelled to over a thousand people. Butte County has a persistent homeless population of 7,500 people; many reside in Chico, and some campers were revealed as resident homeless people who did not live in the fire zone. On December 1, the firefighter camp facilities at the Butte County Fairgrounds became available, whereupon the Walmart camp was closed and the field fenced off, with the remaining fifty refugees relocated to the firefighters' camp.

Mental health support 
Recovery efforts included supporting the mental health of Camp Fire victims, particularly the youth. Some former residents reported survivor guilt, troubling dreams, and symptoms of posttraumatic stress. To ease the stress on fire victims, several people brought therapy dogs from the Butte Humane Society's Animal Assisted Wellness program. Lise Van Susteren summarized the burden these children bear in experiencing climate change, "These kids are at the tip of the spear."

Environmental cleanup 
The Camp Fire cleanup became the largest hazardous material oleanup in state history. Due to the time required to clean up a town of nearly 30,000 people and surrounding rural metro region of another 3,000 people, and the infeasible task of developing temporary housing, residents were allowed to take up residence on their burned-out lots, which possibly exposed them to hazardous materials. Winter rains began at the end of the Camp Fire and as a result, hazardous contaminants soaked into the ground and ran into waterways  which raised concerns for the drinking water. Another concern was benzene contamination from burning plastic pipes. Paradise tested sections of their water supply and initially "22 out of 24 water systems were tested" and announced as passed. Later, the Paradise Irrigation District issued a notice that the water is contaminated and cannot be used. For water tributaries within the 244-square-mile burn, "a months-long water monitoring program [sampled] surface water at least seven times through spring 2019." While heavy metals and dioxins were concerns, a more pressing public health issue was an intestinal parasite, cryptosporidium, to which bare soil provided greater access to water systems.

FEMA, the Army Corps of Engineers, and the California Governor's Office of Emergency Services (CalOES) collaborated on developing a site to process fire zone demolition and remediation debris. Of fifty potential sites within thirty miles of Paradise, they identified the 200-acre Koppers Superfund Site in Oroville as a suitable site based on an industrial zoning and a rail spur; the site ultimately was dismissed due to concerns of toxicity. After consideration, all fifty sites were rejected and instead, hazardous waste, such as electronics, car batteries, and asbestos were hauled several hours by trucks directly from the individual cleanup sites to landfills in California and Nevada.

The government procurement for cleanup was broken into several contract packages and put out to public bid to remove, process, and dispose of 5 million tons of materials at a cost of $3 billion:
 ECC Constructors LLC, SF Bay Area, CA: Remove debris from half of Paradise, CA ($359 million).
 SPSG Partners, a joint venture of Pacific States Environmental Contractors (in partnership with De Silva Gates Construction, Dublin, CA), Goodfellow Brothers Construction, and Sukut Construction, Santa Ana, CA: Remove debris from half of Paradise, CA ($378 million).
 CERES Environmental Services (aka Environmental & Demolition Services Group), Sarasota, FL: Remove debris from areas outside the town of Paradise ($263 million).
 Tetra Tech, Pasadena, CA: Test soils for contamination ($250 million). Note that parent company Tetra Tech EC faked soil tests in Bayview–Hunters Point, San Francisco; two company supervisors were sentenced to prison.
 Offhaul contracts went to several local sites, which avoided the need for rail offhaul to out of state sites:
 Waste Management; Anderson, CA: Contaminated demolition, such as ash, debris, and soil.
 Recology; Wheatland, CA: Contaminated demolition, such as ash, debris, and soil.
 Odin Metal; Oroville, CA: Metals, such as burned vehicles and equipment.
 Granite's Pacific Heights Recycling; Oroville, CA: Concretes, such as house foundations and driveways.
 Franklin Recycling; Paradise, CA: Concretes, such as house foundations and driveways.
 Concrete will be shipped out of the county by truck as needed.

The Paradise Fire Safe Council is looking at putting out bids for salvage logging the 443,000 dead trees, which would otherwise be the responsibility of homeowners at a combined cost of $750 million. There are challenges—such as logging must be within a few months or the trees will begin to rot—these challenges are being tested through a pilot program.

Wildland and climate 
The Los Angeles Times reported the Camp Fire burned across an area burned to bare dirt by a hot burning wildfire ten years earlier, then salvage logged; fire ecologist Chad Hanson suggested brush piles and young trees left over after the salvage logging provided fast-burning fuels aiding the fire's rapid spread. The Camp Fire was initially fueled by dry grass amid sparse pine and oak woodlands. This drove most of the post-event discussion away from timber management as a future fire-prevention solution.

The fire was largely driven by extreme weather conditions — high winds and low humidity — and spread through fuels parched by more than 200 days without significant precipitation, part of a statewide drought related to climate change.

The Sacramento Bee looked at if residential development is appropriate in the Sierra Nevada wildland-urban zones, quoting a former Sacramento Metropolitan Fire District chief, "There's just some places a subdivision shouldn't be built." Issues include if development can be safe, and if safe, what building codes and emergency response infrastructure would be needed. That discussion pointed to other Sierra Foothill communities similar to Paradise. Cal Fire states "Those kinds of geographic features are present in many foothill towns." Those features include proximity and alignment to river canyons channeling wind-fed flames over foothill communities. Visiting Professor Moritz (UC Santa Barbara) notes "if we were to go back and do the wind mapping, we would find, at some intervals, these areas are prone to these north and northeasterly [strong hot autumn wind] events."

Political 
On November 10, then-U.S. president Donald Trump misleadingly stated that "There is no reason for these massive, deadly and costly forest fires in California except that forest management is so poor", including the Camp Fire and the concurrent Woolsey Fire in Southern California. In a tweet, he threatened to end federal assistance unless "gross mismanagement of the forests" is remedied.

Trump elaborated on his claims in an interview with Chris Wallace and during his trip to Paradise, stating "you got to take care of the floors. You know the floors of the forest — very important" and "[Finland] spent a lot of time on raking and cleaning and doing things and they don't have any problem." Finland's president Sauli Niinistö was baffled by Trump's assertions and denied they talked about raking, leading to an Internet phenomenon of Finnish people sharing photos of themselves sarcastically raking forests with items such as house brooms and vacuum cleaners.

Some fire experts refuted Trump's claims, noting Californians were experiencing unusually dry conditions and abnormally high fire danger. Brian Rice, president of the California Professional Firefighters, described Trump's assertion about state forest management practices as "demeaning" and "dangerously wrong," noting that 60 percent of California forests are directly managed by federal agencies, primarily the United States Forest Service, which had reduced spending on forest management in recent years.

Regardless of the assertions for greater attention to raking by the President at the time, an ongoing discussion in California had revolved around the issue of increasing fire hazard due to a buildup of fuels. In 2016, prior to the Camp Fire, then Governor Jerry Brown warned that this is "the new normal." Yet in September 2016, despite unanimous Legislative approval, California Governor Brown vetoed Senate Bill 1463, which aimed to reduce the risk of power lines sparking fires in brush-covered and wooded areas. The key provisions in SB1463 were requirements to define in R.15-05-006 what "Enhanced mitigation measures” means and to explain how concerns of regional fire agencies were incorporated into R.15-05-006. The Governor pointed out that the bill duplicated ongoing efforts by Cal-Fire and PG&E in fire mapping power lines with R.15-05-006. Subsequent to the veto, "on January 19, 2018 the CPUC adopted, via Safety and Enforcement Division's (SED) disposition of a Tier 1 Advice Letter, the final CPUC Fire-Threat Map." See the resulting firemap here, the region that would become the Camp Fire ignition point is a Tier 2 (elevated) hazard, which is a large area that burned heavily in 2008, and much of the burn area is Tier 3 (extreme), which had never burned in recorded history 

Following the Camp Fire, the CPUC moved on a new approach to fire prevention with a vote on December 15, 2018 to improve rules governing when utilities should disable power lines to reduce the risk of fires.

US District Court Judge William Alsup ruled May 7, 2019 that the board of PG&E would be required to tour the fire area, at a hearing on the utility's violation of its criminal Federal probation for its negligence in causing the 2010 San Bruno natural gas pipeline failure and subsequent explosion. This violation of Federal probation predated the Camp Fire; after the 2017 Honey Fire, a much smaller but also in Butte County, investigators found that PG&E equipment started that fire. The company settled with prosecutors but did not properly report these events to its Federal probation officer.

Electrical infrastructure hardening

Going forward post-Camp Fire, policymakers are looking at options to harden the California energy distribution infrastructure against wildfires. A key constraint is that California is reliant on a system of centralized electrical generation with distribution to end-users. One proposal to prevent fires is underground distribution similar to modern suburban electrical distribution. In November 2018 and initiated prior to the Camp Fire, PG&E piloted in the North Bay a hardened section of electrical infrastructure.

While buried power lines will reduce the risk of sparking wildfires, however, that solution increases distribution infrastructure cost by 10 times. A suggestion to reduce cost is to harden the sections of high energy lines through high wind areas upwind of residential communities in the wildland–urban interface, in particular, around river canyons pointing to those residential areas. The State Legislaturers have made efforts towards this strategy, however, while PG&E piloted a segment of hardened infrastructure, PG&E also diverted half the funds intended by the Legislature for this purpose. Hardening utilities with underground placement is common, such as gas and fiber-optic, which are usually buried  The cost to install overhead utilities is $500,000 per mile, while underground utilities are $5 million per mile.

Given the high cost of hardening, figuring out which sections to harden is therefore important. Of 175,000 miles of Californian electrical infrastructure, 80,000 miles is fireprone; currently, those 175,000 miles breakdown into 81,000 miles of overhead electrical distribution, 26,000 miles of underground distribution, and 18,000 miles of overhead-high voltage-transmission. Regardless of the solution chosen, as development and buildout of the State economy continues, that utility distribution system will expand, possibly doubling the current system in the next years. Policymakers will decide if an investment in hardened distribution is equitable and if the existing distribution should be modified as a single project or as a piecemeal replacement as sections of lines require replacement.

Recovery 

The first two building permits were reissued for Paradise after almost five months on March 28, 2019. Local public policymakers want to promote rebuilding with higher standards for fire-resistant construction, upgraded infrastructure, and using the recommended 2009 redesigns for enhanced fire safety, which included expanded road capacity to increase evacuation capacity and to provide better access for emergency equipment. The first Certificate of Occupancy was awarded in July 2019.

The Paradise Seventh-day Adventist church was completely destroyed, as was part of its adjacent academy. Estimates were that at least 600 homes of Adventist Health employees in Paradise had been destroyed. When power was restored to the site, the church began providing free potable water to neighbors. Its leaders said, "Though the physical attributes of our earthly Paradise are destroyed, the spirit of Paradise has spread across the country and around the world, as people are moved to volunteer resources to help." Most other places of worship were also destroyed, including Our Savior Lutheran Church, Ridge Presbyterian Church, Paradise Church of Christ, First Assembly of God, Craig Memorial Congregational Church, Paradise Foursquare, New Life Apostolic Church, Paradise Pentecostal Church of God, and Community Church of the Brethren. The lead pastor of Hope Christian Church, Stan Freitas, wrote, "Building was burnt down, but cross and rock still standing." "The church is still alive." A Church of Jesus Christ of Latter-Day Saints (LDS) meetinghouse and a Center for Spiritual Living were also destroyed.

A community interfaith memorial was held on February 8, 2019, at the Paradise Performing Arts Center. The event was their grand re-opening since the Camp Fire. Over a dozen faith traditions offered a free celebration of life for the lives lost in the Camp Fire. The event was broadcast by Action News Now, NBC attended by 800+ Butte County community members. The event, which promoted healing, unity, and a time for the community to reconnect was sponsored by the Chico Area Interfaith Council. Families received remembrance gifts, and there was prayer, two choirs, piano, and a tribute to each individual who lost their life. The memorial was hosted by Linda Watkins-Bennett and Grammy Award-winning singer-songwriter Red Grammer performed his song called, "We're Made of Love", which was written for the memorial.

Documentaries 

 2019 Netflix documentary titled Fire in Paradise
 2019 Frontline documentary also titled Fire in Paradise
 2020 National Geographic documentary titled Rebuilding Paradise
 2020 This Old House Season 41 featured a four episode series about families rebuilding their homes after the fire.
 2021 BBC One documentary titled Greta Thunberg: A Year to Change the World with Greta Thunberg speaking to witnesses of the wildfires in Paradise
  2021 Bring Your Own Brigade produced and directed by Lucy Walker

See also 

 2018 California wildfires
 Woolsey Fire – A destructive wildfire that burned concurrently in Southern California
 Lytton wildfire - A Canadian wildfire that burned 90% of Lytton, British Columbia in 2021
 List of fires
 Pacific Gas and Electric Company disasters

Notes

References

External links 

 Butte County Recovers
 Camp Fire Incident Information fire.ca.gov. This site publishes press releases and twice-daily "Incident Updates" listing numbers of casualties, structures lost or damages, information on shelters and resources for missing persons, and resources committed to fighting the blaze.
 Camp Fire Incident Maps fire.ca.gov. Daily maps showing fire progression.
 Camp Fire Structure Status. Color coded status of each structure, and images of each destroyed structure.
 
 Camp Fire: Information, Drone Images, 360 Images, Evacuation Map, Cal Fire Structure Status, by Butte County
 Camp Fire in northern California, CIMSS Satellite Blog
 Examining Jerry Brown's veto of California wildfire legislation and the criticism of it – Politifact California

2018 California wildfires
Articles containing video clips
November 2018 events in the United States
Wildfires in Butte County, California